The 1965–66 AHL season was the 30th season of the American Hockey League. Nine teams played 72 games each in the schedule. The league played a limited interlocking schedule with the Western Hockey League which was repeated two seasons later.  The Quebec Aces finished first overall in the regular season. The Rochester Americans won their second consecutive Calder Cup championship.

Final standings
Note: GP = Games played; W = Wins; L = Losses; T = Ties; GF = Goals for; GA = Goals against; Pts = Points;

Scoring leaders

Note: GP = Games played; G = Goals; A = Assists; Pts = Points; PIM = Penalty minutes

 complete list

Calder Cup playoffs
First round
Rochester Americans defeated Quebec Aces 4 games to 2.
Springfield Indians defeated Hershey Bears 3 games to 0.
Cleveland Barons defeated Pittsburgh Hornets 3 games to 0.
Second round
Rochester Americans earned second round bye.
Cleveland Barons defeated Springfield Indians 3 games to 0.  
Finals
Rochester Americans defeated Cleveland Barons 4 games to 2, to win the Calder Cup. 
 list of scores

Trophy and award winners
Team awards

Individual awards

Other awards

See also
List of AHL seasons

References
AHL official site
AHL Hall of Fame
HockeyDB

American Hockey League seasons
2
2